Muriste is a village in Lääneranna Parish, Pärnu County, in southwestern Estonia, on the coast of the Gulf of Riga. It has only 7 inhabitants (as of 1 January 2011).

The northeastern side of the village is covered by Nehatu Nature Reserve.

References

Villages in Pärnu County